Prince Andrey II Yaroslavich (Андрей Ярославич) ( 1222 – 1264) was the third son of Yaroslav II who succeeded his uncle Svyatoslav III as the Grand Duke of Vladimir in 1249. Three years later, he challenged the Mongols and was ousted by them from Russia.

In 1240 Novgorodians expelled his brother, Alexander Nevsky, from the city and asked Yaroslav II to send them another commander. Andrey was sent to the wayward republic instead, only to leave it several months later. When the city was attacked by Teutonic Knights, Yaroslav again sent Andrey with several units to help. In 1242, Andrey joined his Suzdalian forces with Alexander's and saw action in the celebrated Battle on the Ice.

In 1247, when their father died, Andrey and Alexander went to Karakorum in Mongolia, where Andrey was appointed the next Grand Duke of Vladimir by Guyuk Khan. On their return to Vladimir two years later, they found that the capital had been seized by their young brother Mikhail Khorobrit. The latter, however, was killed in battle with Lithuanians several months later.

Upon ascending the golden throne of his fathers, Andrey resolved to assert some independence from the Horde. He married a daughter of Danylo of Halych, who was the Mongols' avowed enemy. A year later, his uncle Svyatoslav, offended by his ousting from Vladimir, went to the Horde to secure the throne for himself. He was followed by Alexander Nevsky, who blamed Andrey for appropriating a portion of tribute due to the Horde. The khan sent a punitive expedition which defeated Andrey near Pereslavl. Novgorod didn't want to give him shelter, either, so that Andrey had to escape to Kolyvan and then to Sweden.

In 1256 Andrey travelled to Sarai to ask pardon for his former infidelity. On his return to Vladimir, he received from Alexander the easternmost lands of Vladimir, including the towns of Nizhny Novgorod and Gorodets on the Volga. After Alexander died in 1263, Andrey aspired to add Vladimir to his possessions, but was thwarted in his designs by his younger brother Yaroslav of Tver.

The princely house of Suzdal and Nizhny Novgorod, which has been known since the 14th century as the House of Shuisky, descends from Andrey II of Vladimir.

Family
He married in 1250/51 to Ustynia, daughter of Daniel of Galicia and had issue:
 Vasily
 Konstantin
 Dmitri of Suzdal. His descendant of 8th generation was Tsar Vasily IV of Russia.

See also
 Bibliography of the history of the Early Slavs and Rus'
 Bibliography of Russian history (1223–1613)
 List of Slavic studies journals
 Rulers of Russia family tree
 Brockhaus and Efron Encyclopedic Dictionary

References

 

1220s births
1264 deaths
Grand Princes of Vladimir
Rurik dynasty
13th-century princes in Kievan Rus'
Eastern Orthodox monarchs